C.A.R.P., formally incorporated as the Canadian Association of Retired Persons, is a national, nonpartisan, not for profit association that advocates on behalf of Canadians as they age. The organization states that its purpose is to promote social change in order to bring financial security, equitable access to health care and freedom from discrimination to its members.

Issues

C.A.R.P. focuses their advocacy on federal and provincial issues of importance to their members across Canada, particularly on matters concerning healthcare and financial security.  Priority issues for members include improvements to long term care homes; increased investments in home care and supports to help older adults live healthfully in their homes; timely access to family physicians and specialists; and overall accountability from the provincial ministries of health, who are under performing other OECD countries in outcomes.

Advocacy issues related to finance include the continued stability of the Canada Pension Plan (CPP), the elimination of mandatory withdrawals from Registered Retirement Income Funds (RRIFs) and increased amounts for seniors living in poverty though the Guaranteed Income Supplement (GIS) and enhancement of the CPP survivor benefit.

C.A.R.P. has been active in disseminating information regarding the American legislation Foreign Account Tax Compliance Act, and the Canadian agreement, FATCA agreement between Canada and the United States, which impacts directly many Canadians.

C.A.R.P. also participated in the debates around pensions and seniors driving.

Organization background and community

C.A.R.P. is modeled after one of the largest lobby groups in the world, the American Association of Retired Persons, but it has been independent since its foundation in 1983.

C.A.R.P. was founded in Toronto by Lillian and Murray Morgenthau in 1985. C.A.R.P. claims over 350,000 members across Canada. Moses Znaimer replaced Lillian Morgenthau as the President of the Board of Directors of C.A.R.P in 2009.

Thousands of volunteers participate in community-based C.A.R.P. chapters from coast to coast.

Chapters serve as important local sounding boards for its advocacy efforts, identifying local and regional issues and helping its national advocacy team to make sure policy recommendations accurately reflect what is happening and needed at ground level for its members. Chapters operate independently, with volunteer boards responsible for recruiting new members and developing engaging programs and activities.

The national office provides policy direction and operational assistance. Chapter membership is diverse, with a wide range of ages, backgrounds and interests. CARP continues to receive requests for help in setting up new chapters and is working aggressively to extend the CARP footprint into more and more communities.

Moses Znaimer was re-elected President of the Association during the Annual General Meeting in 2020. Znaimer is also CEO of ZoomerMedia, which provides back office, IT, marketing and media services to CARP.

Partnership with Zoomer Media Limited
ZML is a publicly traded company on the Toronto Stock Exchange and operates a number of media properties including Zoomer Magazine.  Prospective C.A.R.P. members may be offered a subscription to Zoomer Magazine in combination with their membership to the not-for-profit corporation. ZML provides a number of exclusive discounts on goods and services to C.A.R.P. members as part of an exclusive marketing agreement, including sought after discounts on Home, Auto and Travel Insurance, mobile phone services and dozens of other products and services

C.A.R.P. has responded to concerns about conflict of interest and has been transparent about the relationship between the two entities. C.A.R.P.'s audited financial statements show that ZML has made a significant financial contribution to the operation of the association.

References

External links
CARP

Organizations established in 1985
1985 establishments in Ontario
Advocacy groups in Canada
ZoomerMedia
Retirement in Canada
Seniors' organizations